Bhatiore ( _pa. بھٹیوڑ OR ਭਟੀਓੜ)is a region between the Sillanwali sub district of Sargodha and district chiniot Chiniot formerly a sub district of Jhang in Punjab Province of Pakistan. The area is composed of villages, towns and wells. The region is named after the Bhatti tribe which occupies the cultivated lands here and is the major population and leading tribe of this region.

The Bhatis of this region have migrated from Rajasthan during past some hundred years and some village's names sound like having Rajasthani origin e.g. Jaisalwala, Maru Bhattian.

Famous town of the area is Barana which is bordered with district Sargodha. Other villages and town names are Kot Sultan, Burhani Bhattian, Kanianwali, Kot Ameer, Ganja Bhattian, Inayatpur, Ghoriwala, Thatta Umra, Peer Panja, Gaushewala.

Regions of Punjab, Pakistan